The EuroCup Women (officially FIBA EuroCup Women) is the second-level basketball competition with teams from associate members of FIBA Europe. 
It succeeds the Ronchetti Cup.

System of competition
As for the EuroLeague Women, the EuroCup had a Final Four to appoint the winner from 2003 (year of creation) to 2005. In 2006, this system is abandoned and we go back to the former format of the Ronchetti Cup, that is to say a final in a home and away game.

Results

Performances

By country

By club

See also 

 Men's competitions
 EuroLeague
 Basketball Champions League
 EuroCup Basketball
 FIBA Europe Cup
 Women's competitions
 EuroCup Women
 SuperCup Women

References

External links
EuroCup Women Official Website

 
 
Sports leagues established in 2002
2002 establishments in Europe